Bajwat (Punjabi) is an area of the Sialkot district (32°62 N and 74°60 E) and Narowal district of Punjab province in Pakistan. It comprises 84 villages, with a population of 110,000 according to 2018 Servery.

Before partition, Bajwat was ruled by Punjabi Khatri (Kshatriyas) zamindars. The area is a wetland with the presence of Marala Headworks, Manawar Tawi River, Jammu Tawi, and many nullahs, ponds and marshy areas. This habitat attracts a large number of waterfowl and other birds, as well as migratory species. Marala Headworks, built in 1965–68, is located in Bajwat's south-west corner. Two canals, Upper Chenab and the Marala-Ravi link canal, flow from Marala Headworks. These canals also provide habitats for the avian fauna of the area. The Wildlife Department of Punjab (Pakistan) has declared the area a “game reserve.” The area is sub-mountainous and 800 feet above the sea level. The soil is loamy and non-calcareous with sandy and clay components predominating. Average rainfall is 965 mm.

Geography 
Bajwat covers an area of 19,452 hectares (48,068 acres). The city of Jammu is located in eastern Bajwat; Jourian in Kashmir and Sialkot city are in the south, with Gujrat district to the west. A 60-kilometer length of the northern and eastern border forms part of the Line of Control between Pakistan and Kashmir.

Bajwat encompasses a complex of natural rivers habitats along the Chenab River and two of its tributaries (Jamana Tavi and Manwran Tavi), extending up to the border with India.

Climate 
Summer temperatures reach 46 degrees Fahrenheit, while the winter season sometimes records temperatures of 0 degrees Fahrenheit. Rainfall in the area is quite high, which sometimes results flooding and loss of crops.

Environment 
Bajwat is a wetland, attracting avifauna, especially waterfowl, due to the presence of Marala Headworks, three rivers, more than six nullahs, and many ponds and marshy areas. These water reservoirs support a variety of aquatic and semi-aquatic plants, fishes, amphibians, aquatic arthropods and their larvae, supporting the avian fauna. Bajwat has a peninsula-shaped area protruding out to the Jammu region.

Economy

Agriculture 
Agriculture is the main occupation in Bajwat. Many crops are grown there, especially wheat, rice and sugarcane. Orchards produce mangoes, oranges, strawberries and guavas.

Culture and Entertainment

Games 
The people of Bajwat play games including Kushti (Indian style wrestling), Lookn, Matti etc.. The most common games are cricket and football.

Politics 
Punjabi Khatris migrated and now there are two major castes in Bajwat - Gujjar and Arain. As of 2018, Village Kachimand is politically ascendant, with Loni Khari also holding considerable sway. The area is politically active, and produced former National Assembly Speaker Chaudhry Amir Hussain. Phuklian is the district of Bajwat that front have chak santhal village area that have bazar of main Bajwat. Phuklian has post offices, schools, colleges and national banks and qualified schools and colleges. The Phuklian police station is the larger police included in the larger Sialkot police station police station of Bajwat. These areas are very dangerous for firing when India war mostly peoples go out the city from the difficult faces. But the people of Bajwat are very kind-hearted and welcome everyone without any hesitation.

See also 
 Bajwat Wildlife Sanctuary

Sialkot District
Narowal District